Laurence or Lawrence Allen may refer to:

Laurence W. Allen (1892–1968), English World War I flying ace
Laurence Edmund Allen (1906–1983), American journalist

See also
Larry Allen (disambiguation)
Laurie Allen (disambiguation)
Lawrence Allen (disambiguation)